Sherlock Holmes: Consulting Detective may refer to:

 Sherlock Holmes: Consulting Detective (gamebook) (1981), a book-based game published by Sleuth Publications
 Sherlock Holmes: Consulting Detective (1991), a video game adapted by ICOM Simulations from the Sleuth Publications gamebook
 Sherlock Holmes: Consulting Detective Vol. II (1992), sequel to the 1991 video game
 Sherlock Holmes: Consulting Detective Vol. III (1993), sequel to the 1992 video game